Arunachal Pradesh State Road Transport Corporation (or APSRTC) is the state-owned road transport corporation in the Indian state of Arunachal Pradesh. Its headquarters are located at APST Bus Station of Itanagar.

APSTS is running daily bus services from Itanagar to most district headquarters including Tezpur, Guwahati in Assam and Shillong in Meghalaya as well as Dimapur in Nagaland.

References 

Companies based in Itanagar
Indian companies established in 1975
Transport in Arunachal Pradesh
State agencies of Arunachal Pradesh
State road transport corporations of India
1975 establishments in Arunachal Pradesh
Transport companies established in 1975
Government agencies established in 1975
Bus companies of India